Edward Normand Allen (April 18, 1891 – November 14, 1972) was an American politician who was the 92nd lieutenant governor of Connecticut from 1951 to 1955.

Early life
Allen was born in Hartford, Hartford County, Connecticut on April 18, 1891. He attended Norwich University and graduated from Yale University. He served in the U.S. Army in the First World War. In 1916 he rode with General Pershing in the expedition into Mexico pursuing rebel Pancho Villa. He married Ruby Tuttle (1894–1992) on December 13, 1916. They had three children: Jane Allen Merrick (1917–2000), Caroline Allen Talbot (1920–2015), and Frances Allen (1924–2000). From 1920 to 1924, he was Hartford Police Commissioner; later he was head of the Sage-Allen department store. He married Mildred Pomeranz November 7, 1935. They had two children, Normand Francis Allen II (1935–present) and Mary.

Political career
Allen was a Republican and a member of the Connecticut State Senate for the 1st District from 1927 to 1929. He was an alternate delegate to the Republican National Convention from Connecticut in 1928. From 1947 to 1948, he was mayor of Hartford. He was elected Lieutenant Governor of Connecticut as a running mate of John D. Lodge in 1950 to the first four-year term of governor and lieutenant governor of the State. They served for one term, from January 3, 1951, to January 5, 1955.

Allen's second wife, Mildred Pomeranz Allen, who was also a Republican, was Secretary of State of Connecticut from 1955 to 1959.

Allen died on November 14, 1972, and was interred at Enfield Street Cemetery, Enfield, Connecticut.

See also
List of governors of Connecticut

References

1891 births
1972 deaths
Connecticut state senators
Mayors of Hartford, Connecticut
Lieutenant Governors of Connecticut
20th-century American politicians